Sir Claud Alexander, 1st Baronet (15 January 1831 – 23 May 1899) was a Scottish Conservative Party politician who sat in the House of Commons from 1874 to 1885.

Life
Alexander was the eldest son of Boyd Alexander and his wife Sophia Elizabeth Hobhouse, daughter of Sir Benjamin Hobhouse. He was educated at Eton College and Christ Church, Oxford. In 1849, he joined the Grenadier Guards. He served in the Crimean War including at the Siege of Sevastapol. He was awarded the Crimean Medal and Clasp, the Turkish War Medal and the Order of the Medjidie 5th Class. He reached the rank of Colonel in 1870. He was a Justice of the Peace and Deputy Lieutenant for Ayrshire and Renfrewshire.

In 1868 Alexander stood unsuccessfully for parliament at Ayrshire South. At the 1874 general election he was elected Member of Parliament for Ayrshire South. He passed the "Industrial Schools Acts Amendment Act" in 1880. He held the seat until 1885. He was created a baronet in 1886.

Alexander lived at Ballochmyle House, which he extended in 1886. He died at the age of 68.

Family
Alexander married Eliza Speirs, daughter of Alexander Speirs of Elderslie who was Lord Lieutenant of Renfrewshire.  He was succeeded as baronet by his son, also called Claud, who founded the British Cat Club in 1901.

References

External links
 

1831 births
1899 deaths
Members of the Parliament of the United Kingdom for Scottish constituencies
UK MPs 1880–1885
UK MPs 1874–1880
People educated at Eton College
Alumni of Christ Church, Oxford
Baronets in the Baronetage of the United Kingdom
British Army personnel of the Crimean War
Grenadier Guards officers
Recipients of the Order of the Medjidie, 5th class
Scottish Tory MPs (pre-1912)
Claud